Dominic Ashley Green (born 5 July 1989 in Newham, London) is an English footballer who plays for Barking FC.

Career
Green signed for Peterborough United from Dagenham & Redbridge for an undisclosed fee on 27 August 2008. He signed for Rushden & Diamonds on a month's loan on 16 August 2010. In March 2011, he joined United Counties league side St Neots Town on loan. Green was released by Peterborough United on 28 June 2011.
On 1 September, Green signed for Dagenham & Redbridge on a free transfer. In January 2013, he joined Football Conference side Dartford on a one-month loan deal. On 7 May 2013, he was released by the Daggers due to the expiry of his contract. In August 2013, Green joined Conference South side Ebbsfleet United after impressing during pre-season.

After a short spell with East Thurrock, Green joined Hornchurch in October 2019.

Career statistics

References

External links
Dominic Green player profile at daggers.co.uk

1989 births
Living people
Association football midfielders
English footballers
West Ham United F.C. players
Dagenham & Redbridge F.C. players
Peterborough United F.C. players
Thurrock F.C. players
Chesterfield F.C. players
Rushden & Diamonds F.C. players
St Neots Town F.C. players
Dartford F.C. players
Ebbsfleet United F.C. players
Tonbridge Angels F.C. players
Whitehawk F.C. players
Hayes & Yeading United F.C. players
East Thurrock United F.C. players
Bishop's Stortford F.C. players
Hornchurch F.C. players
English Football League players
National League (English football) players
Footballers from West Ham
Black British sportsmen